North Hyde Park is a neighborhood within the city limits of Tampa, Florida. As of the 2010 census the neighborhood had a population of 1,770. The ZIP Codes serving the neighborhood are 33606, 33607 and 33609.

Geography
North Hyde Park boundaries are Interstate 275  to the north, Kennedy Boulevard to the south, Armenia Avenue. to the west, and Willow Avenue to the east.

Demographics
Source: Hillsborough County Atlas

At the 2010 census there were 1,770 people and 688 households residing in the neighborhood. The population density was 4,229/mi2. The racial makeup of the neighborhood was 38% White, 56% African American, less than 0.5% Native American, less than 0.5% Asian, 3% from other races, and 2% from two or more races. Hispanic or Latino of any race were 19%.

Of the 688 households 21% had children under the age of 18 living with them, 23% were married couples living together, 23% had a female householder with no husband present, and 14% were non-families. 32% of households were made up of individuals.

The age distribution was 20% under the age of 18, 29% from 18 to 34, 21% from 35 to 49, 19% from 50 to 64, and 13% 65 or older. For every 100 females, there were 108.1 males.

The per capita income for the neighborhood was $16,281. About 26% of the population were below the poverty line. 32% of those under age 18 and 14% of those age 65 or over.

See also
Hyde Park
Neighborhoods in Tampa, Florida

References

External links
North Hyde Park Civic Association

Neighborhoods in Tampa, Florida